General elections were held in Japan on 1 September 1894. The Liberal Party remained the largest party, winning 107 of the 300 seats

Results

Post-election composition by prefecture

Notes

References

1894 09
1894 elections in Japan
Japan
September 1894 events
1894